The mountain worm-eating snake (Trachischium monticola) is a species of colubrid snake.

Geographic range
It is found in India (Assam, Meghalaya; Arunachal Pradesh [Chessa - Papum Pare district]), Bangladesh, Nepal and China (Tibet).

Description
It is dark brown dorsally, with two pale brown stripes edged with black lines. Ventrally it is yellowish. Juveniles have an interrupted yellow collar. The smooth dorsal scales are arranged in 15 rows. Adults may attain 23 cm (9 inches) in total length, with a tail 3 cm (1⅛ inches) long.

References

 Cantor, T.E. 1839. Spicilegium serpentium indicorum [parts 1 and 2]. Proc. Zool. Soc. London, 7: 31–34, 49–55.

Trachischium
Taxa named by Theodore Edward Cantor
Reptiles described in 1839
Reptiles of India
Reptiles of Bangladesh
Reptiles of Nepal
Reptiles of China